Feixiang Park Station, known as Yuanjing Station and later Yuncheng Station during planning, is a metro station on Line 2 of the Guangzhou Metro. It is located under the west side of Yuncheng East Road, the east side of Yuncheng West Road and the south side of the former Baiyun International Airport, in the Baiyun District of Guangzhou. It started operation on 25September 2010.

Notes

References

Railway stations in China opened in 2010
Guangzhou Metro stations in Baiyun District